Dasyskenea digeronimoi is a species of sea snail, a marine gastropod mollusk in the family Skeneidae.

Description

Distribution
This species occurs in the Mediterranean Sea off Italy.

References

 La Perna R. (1999 ["1998"]) A new Mediterranean Skeneoides (Gastropoda: Skeneidae) from a shallow-water cave. Journal of Conchology 36(4): 21–27.
 Nofroni, I., Renda, W., Agamennone, F. & Giacobbe, S. (2022). Dasyskenea dibellai n. sp. from the Central Mediterranean Sea (Gastropoda Vetigastropoda Skeneidae). Biodiversity Journal. 13(1): 155–162.

External links

Dasyskenea
Gastropods described in 1998